Connors Park is a baseball venue in Loudonville, New York, United States.  It is home to the Siena Saints baseball team of the NCAA Division I Metro Atlantic Athletic Conference.  The field has been home to Siena's baseball program since its inception in the 1950s.  It seats 500 spectators.  Features include chairback seating, a team clubhouse, and brick dugouts.  Plassman Hall, a Siena dormitory, is visible beyond the center field fence, while J. Spencer and Patricia Standish Library stands beyond the right field fence.

Renovations

On June 1, 2015, it was announced that the Siena Baseball Field would receive major upgrades scheduled to be finished by Fall 2015. The $500,000 renovations would cover outfield irrigation, new seating systems with stadium backed seating, and a new press box with filming platforms.

Events 
The field hosted the 2013 Liberty League Baseball Tournament, won by RPI.

See also 
 List of NCAA Division I baseball venues

References 

College baseball venues in the United States
Baseball venues in New York (state)
Siena Saints baseball
1950s establishments in New York (state)
Sports venues in Albany County, New York